Ölmüş Bir Kadının Evrakı Metrukesi (Dead Letter of a Deceased Woman) is a 1956 Turkish romantic drama film directed by Metin Erksan and Semih Evin, based on a novel by Güzide Sabri. It stars Sezer Sezin, Kenan Artun, and Altan Karındaş.

References

External links
 
 

1956 films
Turkish romantic drama films
1956 romantic drama films
Films directed by Metin Erksan
Turkish black-and-white films